Miriam Sharpe is a fictional character appearing in American comic books published by Marvel Comics.

Alfre Woodard portrayed the character in the Marvel Cinematic Universe film Captain America: Civil War (2016).

Publication history
Created by writer Mark Millar and artist Steven McNiven, she first made her appearance during the 2006 crossover event Civil War #1 as an anti-superhero protester modeled after activist Cindy Sheehan.

Marvel editor-in-chief Joe Quesada has stated that, at one point during the planning of Civil War, Miriam Sharpe was intended "to shoot Cap right after he puts his hands up to be handcuffed". Mark Millar has confirmed that Sharpe's concept came, in part, from Cindy Sheehan, although other statements have tied her creation to the four widows of firefighters from New Jersey who died during the September 11 attacks, and who pushed for the creation of the 9/11 Commission. Others point to Sharpe as representing public opinion in the Marvel Universe.

Fictional character biography
All that is known about Sharpe prior to the Civil War storyline that she was married; was a resident of Stamford, Connecticut; and had a young son named Damien who attended Stamford Elementary. Her son was at school the day that a fight between the New Warriors and several supervillains destroyed much of Stamford, including the elementary school. After her son's death, Sharpe became the most powerful voice in the emerging Pro-Registration Movement, demanding the government pass the Superhuman Registration Act (SHRA). At a memorial service for the victims of the Stamford attack, Sharpe had a highly publicized confrontation with Tony Stark where she accused the Avengers' benefactor of being there just to "play hero". It was this confrontation with Sharpe that convinced Stark to also champion the Registration Act as Iron Man. However, Stark had in fact already been covertly supporting Registration Act even before the Stamford disaster. Sharpe is widely noted by pundits as a brilliant political operator. In the weeks following the Stamford disaster, she managed to create a support base that would gather hundreds to march on the White House, influence superhumans, and eventually convince Congress and the president to pass the superhuman registration act.

Sharpe appeared on stage at the press conference where Spider-Man unmasked himself as one of the first public supporters.

Sharpe attended Bill Foster's funeral after he was killed by a cyborg clone of Thor. She would again speak with Iron Man, this time to bolster Iron Man's commitment to the SHRA while also comparing "Thor" killing Bill Foster to a policeman killing a thug. She also gave him an Iron Man model, her son's favourite toy, to remind Iron Man of what they were fighting for.

Wolverine would also seek Sharpe out to tell her the story of bringing justice to Nitro and to former Damage Control Inc. CEO Walter Declun (who gave Nitro Mutant Growth Hormone pills to boost power which resulted in the destruction of Stamford and giving Declum many profitable contracts for rebuilding).

Stark shows her a series of gardens created as a memorial to the children lost in the Stamford incident. It is here Sharpe thanks both Stark and Mister Fantastic for backing her idea of superhero registration despite its negative side effects.

Sharpe joins Stark following the climactic battle to discuss the future in the wake of the Pro-Registration victory. As they discuss future plans, including Stark's recent promotion to Director of S.H.I.E.L.D., Sharpe tells Stark that she has finally started to believe in superheroes again, thanks to Stark.

In light of the public relationship between Stark and Maya Hansen, the creator of the Extremis virus, who Sharpe considers a mass murderer, Sharpe went on the television program Viewpoint to publicly attack the government for supporting Hansen.

Sharpe is later on hand to support the appointment of Ultra Girl as director of the Junior Guardsmen, a youth branch of the Initiative, akin to the JROTC program.

During the 2011 "Fear Itself" storyline, she saves surviving New Warrior Robbie Baldwin (Speedball), who was involved in the Stamford Incident, from an angry mob at the time when Serpent and his Worthy were causing fear and chaos across the globe. During this time, she forgave Speedball for what happened in Stamford. She tells the mob that she doesn't believe Baldwin killed her son, that the villain he irresponsibly attacked did. Miriam comes to understand the entire world is under attack by a mysterious force of destruction and that Baldwin's resources as an Avengers associate and Miriam's disaster recovery training can do good. They work together to assist small towns the Avengers have not yet reached.

Other versions
In a tie-in to the 2015 Secret Wars comic book storyline, this version of Civil War takes place in an alternate event in the Negative Zone prison as Captain America's Anti-Reg forces and against Iron Man's pro-registration forces fought. During that time the self-destruct system was active and both sides escape through Cloak, but the explosion from the prison burst through his portal and destroys all of St. Louis along with the civilian population. The Battleworld location for this alternate reality fragment is called the Warzone. Six years later, Miriam Sharpe resides in the Divide, a community in the ruins of St. Louis that borders both "The Iron" led by President Tony Stark, and "The Blue" led by General America. She contacts both and arranges a meeting in an attempt to bring peace to the two sides. During the talks, she is fatally shot by a sniper, leading to the breakdown of the talks and resumption of hostilities.

In other media
Alfre Woodard portrays Miriam Sharpe in the 2016 film Captain America: Civil War, which was based on the "Civil War" storyline. In the film, her son was killed during the Avengers' battle in Sokovia in Avengers: Age of Ultron, and she confronts Tony Stark, blaming him and the Avengers for his death, prompting Stark to support the Sokovia Accords.

References

External links
 Miriam Sharpe at Marvel.com
 Miriam Sharpe at Marvel Wiki
 Miriam Sharpe at Comic Vine

Characters created by Mark Millar
Comics characters introduced in 2006
Fictional activists
Marvel Comics characters